Kehle may refer to:

People
 Anton Kehle (1947–1997), German ice hockey player

Places
 Kehle Glacier, Antarctica